The Robertson Brothers, John Holland Robertson ( –1909), William Robertson ( – 24 September 1914) and Robert Robertson (5 November 1846 – 16 December 1928) were pioneer cattle, sheep and horse breeders of South Australia.

History
Robert Robertson sen. ( – 9 February 1847) a sea captain, and his wife Margaret Robertson, née Harper (c. 1816 – 21 December 1898) arrived in South Australia on the Buckinghamshire in March 1839. They lived at Salisbury for a few months, then Pewsey Vale, then settled in Gawler, where they built, and for a time ran, the Old Bushman Inn. They then tried farming at Angas Park then the Lyndoch Valley. They had three sons John, William and Robert.

After the death of her husband, Margaret married Richard Holland (c. 1805 – 25 November 1881), a well-known farmer and horse breeder of "Turretfield", near Rosenthal, now known as Rosedale between Gawler and Angaston.

Around 1863 the brothers acquired Bookpurnong Station from brewers Chambers and Blades, and in 1873 disposed of it to A. B. Murray.

In 1862, James Chambers died, shortly followed by his partner William Finke (c. 1815 – 17 January 1864). Their properties Bookmark and Chowilla were (in 1867?) taken over by Chambers's brother John, then transferred to Richard Holland who, on 30 June 1870, took up an area adjoining the river and extending north-east from Spring Cart Gully. These three leases subsequently came into possession of John Holland Robertson, William Robertson and Robert Robertson. The South Australian government took over part of Bookmark for Chaffey's irrigation scheme and the creation of the town of Renmark, after which the name of Bookmark was changed to Calperum.

In 1880 they, with W. R. Cave, purchased Kalamurina Station near Lake Eyre.

In 1883 they purchased Nickavilla Station on the Bulloo River in Queensland from J & D McIvers. William was sole owner from 1890 to 1900, when he was forced to abandon it.

The three boys were educated at John L. Young's Adelaide Educational Institution.

In 1886 they purchased Chester Hall Farm from their uncle, George Harper, for an annuity of £200 per annum for life. This was taken over by William in 1890.

In 1888 the Robertson brothers dissolved their partnership, with John carrying on at Bookmark, and Robert carried on at Chowilla until 1919, when be formed Chowilla into a company. William took over Turretfield, Nickavilla and Chester Hall properties with their attendant encumbrances.

Richard Holland
Richard "Dick" Holland (c. 1805 – 25 November 1881) was born in New South Wales, and was the founder of "Turretfield" racehorse stud.

One of his horses, "Australian Buck", won the 1872 Adelaide Cup, and "The Assyrian" (formerly "Rothschild") won the 1882 Melbourne Cup.

In 1908 Turretfield was sold to the South Australian Government for agriculture research, and is now part of the SARDI. The original house still stands and is at Holland Road, Rosedale, South Australia 5350

John Holland Robertson
John Robertson ( – 20 January 1909) was born in Lyndoch and was educated first at Mr. Burton's school, Gawler, and later at John L. Young's Adelaide Educational Institution.

In the 1870s John was manager of Turretfield's cattle raising venture, and with his two brothers carried on the Turretfield Stud in succession to Mr. Holland, and bred many successful racehorses.

Nickavilla was the name of John's house in Childers Street c. 1886

He and his brother Robert took over management of Chowilla and Bookmark stations. They dissolved the partnership and John took over Bookmark station, making it his home and later renaming it as "Calperum".

He took a keen interest in sport, and was recognised as a crack rifle and pigeon shot, winning many trophies with his guns. He was well known all along the Murray, and particularly at Renmark and was much esteemed for his hospitality and kindly nature. As a hobby he made violins, at which he was an adept.

He was a prominent member of the Royal Agricultural Society.

John Holland Robertson held the Calperum lease from 1896 until his death in 1909, the property remaining in the family until the death of the last daughter in 1953.

Family
He married Ellen Rees George (c. 1852 – 31 May 1948) and had four daughters: 
Ellen Margaret Robertson (18 December 1878 – ) married Frederick William Harris ( – ) of Sydney, New South Wales, on 25 January 1916.
Madeline "Madge" Robertson (30 January 1881 – 14 March 1848) married Charles Ansell Lushington "Charlie" Morant ( –1966), of Walteela Station, near Renmark, on 28 April 1908. Charles was eldest son of Colonel C.M.A. Morant (c. 1845–1911).
Marian  Rosina Robertson (29 November 1882 – 11 March 1952) married Charles Edgar Turner (c. August 1887 – 1957) on 30 June 1914. They divorced in 1921; she married again, to (John) Webb Warren (1878–1937), manager of Calperum Station.
Juliet Hope Robertson (3 June 1886 – 1958) married Douglas Lockhart Smith ( – 1962) on 25 November 1913

William Robertson
William Robertson ( – 24 September 1914) and his brothers moved to Turretfield when their mother married Richard Holland. William was involved in his stepfather's highly successful racehorse breeding business.

He was a partner with his brothers in Chowilla and Bookmark stations, and was regarded as one of the leading sportsmen of the Wentworth district, where apart from his racetrack successes he was known as an excellent shot.

He had a business partnership with W. R. Cave. Cave's son Tom was drowned in 1886 while holidaying at Chowilla.

He persuaded his brothers to invested in Kalamurina Station, near Lake Eyre, with W. R. Cave, and took it over when the partnership dissolved. He bought out Cave's interest in 1897.

He bought out his brothers' interest in Chester Hall Farm in 1890. In 1897, as his financial position deteriorated, he transferred it to his wife, a subject of Supreme Court action by the Union Bank of Australia after he was declared insolvent.

In 1890 he took over Nickavilla Station, Queensland, managed by J. Gordon Fraser, but a series of poor seasons left him financially stretched and was resumed by the bank in 1899 and Turretfield was resumed by its mortgagees and he moved to Netherby. He was declared insolvent in 1902.

He and W. R. Cave were part of the committee charged with selecting horses for the Boer War.

He was member of the Adelaide Racing Club, where he was known as "Willie Robertson", and Chairman from December 1892 to 1902.

When Turretfield was broken up he retired to "The Gunyah", Wilmington, where he ran a small stud based on his mare Tinmine and her daughters Tinfoil, Stannine and Stannary Hills, from which he bred The Tinman, Tinbrook, Humberette and Dardurr. He was an active promoter of the racing clubs of the north, and was an early advocate of paid stewards on race courses. His last years were marred by the after-effects of breaking his leg in a trap accident.

Family
He married Blanch  Scott ( – 14 March 1934) of Wilmington on 23 April 1886. They had two daughters:
Margaret Robertson (1887–1968) married Frank Compson Daw (1881–1963) on 6 October 1910
Nell Hope Robertson (1892 – 10 September 1913) died of pneumonia.

Robert Robertson
Robert "Bob" Robertson (5 November 1846 – 16 December 1928), although he never learned a trade, was remarkably handy with tools and carpentry work. He did all the joinery, roofing, and all the woodwork at both Chowilla and Bookmark, and like his brother, was famous for instrument-making, having made three cellos and a violin. The cabin of W. A. Robertson's motorboat Lotus was also his handiwork.

Robert was an excellent pigeon shooter and won many trophies in Melbourne and elsewhere with his well-known Purdey gun. He was also an excellent rifle shot, and won a match at Smithfield, using the left shoulder, as his right was blackened while practising.

Family
He married Adelaide Mary Harvey (1859–1950), of Blanchetown, in 1878. Among their children were:
William Arthur Robertson (1879–1954) married Marjory Mary Compson Daw ( – ) on 18 April 1914, lived at Chowilla
Robert "Robbie" Robertson (1881–) married Isidore Claire Dale (1888–1975) on 9 December 1912, moved to Condoblin
John Harper Robertson (1883–1968) married Elizabeth Florence ?? ( – 1962), lived at "Glenloth", O'Halloran Hill
Adelaide Mary "Della" Robertson (1884–1957) married  Cyril Lang (1892–1965), of "Wiela", via Renmark on 29 April 1922
Douglas Robertson (1887 – 1953? 1966?) married Alice Ada Cowell (1887–1975) on 29 August 1918, lived at "Oakley", Nuriootpa
Kathleen Robertson (1891– ) married Desmond Theodore DuRieu ( –1969) on 4 March 1924, lived at Renmark.

External links
Turretfield Research Centre
Sketch of "Holland House", Turretfield

See also
Bowman brothers
Chambers brothers (pastoralists)

References 

Australian pastoralists
Settlers of South Australia
South Australian families